Massie is a locality in the Southern Downs Region, Queensland, Australia.

History 
The locality was named after the Massie railway station which was named by the Queensland Railways Department after Robert George Massie, a pastoralist of South Toolburra, who was formerly a Commissioner of Crown Lands for MacLeay River District and later a Member of the Queensland Legislative Council and a Member of the New South Wales Legislative Council for the Pastoral districts of New England and MacLeay.

References 

Southern Downs Region
Localities in Queensland